Antonio Starrabba (o Starabba), Marquess of Rudinì (16 April 18397 August 1908) was an Italian statesman, Prime Minister of Italy between 1891 and 1892 and from 1896 until 1898.

Biography

Early life and patriotic activities
He was born in Palermo (then part of the Kingdom of the Two Sicilies) into an  aristocratic Sicilian family. However, his family was of a more cultured, liberal disposition than many of their contemporaries.

In 1859, he joined the revolutionary committee which paved the way for Garibaldi's triumphs in the following year. After spending a short time at Turin as attaché to the Italian foreign office, he was elected mayor of Palermo. In 1866, he displayed considerable personal courage and energy in quelling an insurrection of separatist and reactionary tendencies. The prestige thus acquired led to his appointment as prefect of Palermo. It was while occupying that position that he put down brigandage throughout the province. In 1868, he was prefect of Naples.

In October 1869 he became minister of the interior in the Menabrea cabinet. The cabinet fell a few months later, and although Starabba was an elected member of parliament for Canicattì, he held no important position until, upon the death of Marco Minghetti in 1886, he became leader of the Right.

Political career and premierships
Early in 1891, he succeeded Francesco Crispi as premier and minister of foreign affairs, forming a coalition cabinet with a part of the Left under Giovanni Nicotera. His administration proved vacillating, but it initiated the economic reforms by virtue of which Italian finances were put on a sound basis and also renewed the Triple Alliance.

He was overthrown in May 1892 by a vote of the Chamber and was succeeded by Giovanni Giolitti. Upon the return of his rival, Crispi, to power in December 1893, he resumed political activity, allying himself with the Radical leader, Felice Cavallotti.

The crisis consequent upon the disastrous battle of Adowa enabled Rudinì to return to power as premier and minister of the interior in a cabinet formed by the veteran Conservative, General Ricotti. He signed the Treaty of Addis Ababa that formally ended the First Italo–Ethiopian War recognizing Ethiopia as an independent country. He endangered relations with Great Britain by the unauthorized publication of confidential diplomatic correspondence in a Green-book on Abyssinian affairs.

Di Rudinì recognized the excessive brutality of the repression of the Fasci Siciliani under his predecessor Crispi. Many Fasci members were pardoned and released from jail. He made it clear though that a reorganization of the Fasci would not be tolerated. Di Rudini's minister of the treasury Luigi Luzzatti passed two measures of social legislation in 1898. The industrial workmen's compensation scheme from 1883 was made obligatory with the employer bearing all costs; and a voluntary fund for contributory disability and old age pensions was created.

To satisfy the anti-colonial party, he ceded Kassala to Great Britain, thereby provoking much indignation in Italy. His internal policy was marked by continual yielding to Radical pressure and by persecution of Crispi. During his second term of office, he thrice modified his cabinet (July 1896, December 1897, and May 1898) without strengthening his political position. By dissolving the Chamber early in 1897 and favoring Radical candidates in the general election, he paved the way for the outbreak of popular uprisings about rising prices in May 1898. Rudinì declared the state of siege at Naples, Florence, Livorno and Milan, and the suppression of the riot resulted in a bloodshed in Milan. Indignation at the results of his policy left him without support of both the Left – who blamed him for the bloodshed – and the Right – who blamed him for the permissiveness that allegedly had promoted the uprisings and led to his overthrow in June 1898.

Death and legacy
Di Rudinì retained his seat in Parliament until his death in 1908. Has reputed to be a thorough gentleman and grand seigneur. One of the largest and wealthiest landowners in Sicily, he managed his estates on liberal lines, and was never troubled by agrarian disturbances. The marquis, who had not been in office since 1898, died at Rome in August, 1908, leaving a son, Carlo, who married a daughter of Henry Labouchère.

In many respects Rudinì, though leader of the Right and nominally a Conservative politician, proved a dissolving element in the Italian Conservative ranks. By his alliance with the Liberals under Nicotera in 1891, and by his understanding with the Radicals under Cavallotti in 1894-1898; by abandoning his Conservative colleague, General Ricotti, to whom he owed the premiership in 1896; and by his vacillating action after his fall from power, he divided and demoralized a constitutional party which, with more sincerity and less reliance upon political cleverness, he might have welded into a solid parliamentary organization.

Many books have been written about his life, including La settimana dell'anarchia del 1866 a Palermo by Gaspare di Mercurio.

List of Rudinì's cabinets

1st cabinet  (6 February 1891  15 May 1892)

2nd cabinet  (10 March 1896  15 July 1896)

3rd cabinet  (15 July 1896  14 December 1897)

Changes:
 On 18 September 1897, Giovanni Codronchi became Minister of Public Education, substituting Emanuele Gianturco

4th cabinet  (14 December 1897  1 June 1898)

5th cabinet  (1 June 1898  29 June 1898)

Orders and decorations
 : Knight of the Supreme Order of the Most Holy Annunciation, 23 October 1896
  Kingdom of Prussia: Knight of the Order of the Black Eagle, 3 February 1892

See also
Fiorenzo Bava Beccaris
Umberto I
Gaetano Bresci

References

 Sarti, Roland (2004). Italy: a reference guide from the Renaissance to the present, New York: Facts on File Inc., 
 Seton-Watson, Christopher (1967). Italy from liberalism to fascism, 1870-1925,  New York: Taylor & Francis, 1967 

Rudini, Antonio
Rudini, Antonio
Rudini, Antonio
Rudini, Antonio
Rudini, Antonio
Rudini
19th-century Italian people
Members of the Chamber of Deputies (Kingdom of Italy)
Deputies of Legislature X of the Kingdom of Italy
Deputies of Legislature XI of the Kingdom of Italy
Deputies of Legislature XII of the Kingdom of Italy
Deputies of Legislature XIII of the Kingdom of Italy
Deputies of Legislature XIV of the Kingdom of Italy
Deputies of Legislature XV of the Kingdom of Italy
Deputies of Legislature XVI of the Kingdom of Italy
Deputies of Legislature XVII of the Kingdom of Italy
Deputies of Legislature XVIII of the Kingdom of Italy
Deputies of Legislature XIX of the Kingdom of Italy
Deputies of Legislature XX of the Kingdom of Italy
Deputies of Legislature XXI of the Kingdom of Italy
Deputies of Legislature XXII of the Kingdom of Italy